Lisa Stone Barnes (born July 16, 1966) is an American businesswoman and politician. A member of the Republican Party, she was elected to the North Carolina House of Representatives in 2018 after serving for six years on the Nash County board of commissioners. Rather than seek reelection, Barnes instead decided to instead run for the state senate in 2020, defeating former senator Allen Wellons.

Early life and education
Barnes was born Donna Lisa Stone to Mr. and Mrs. Donald R. Stone in Nash County, North Carolina. She graduated from Southern Nash High School and Peace College before marrying Johnny Carson Barnes at Middlesex Church of God on December 12, 1987. She received a Bachelor of Arts degree in political science from North Carolina State University in 1988 and completed the legal assistant program at Meredith College.

Political career

Barnes ran for the 4th district seat on the Nash County board of commissioners in 2012, challenging incumbent Republican Danny Tyson. Central to the race was a proposed Sanderson Farms poultry processing plant, which Tyson, who was running for a third term, supported. Barnes, having previously cited environmental concerns about the project during her tenure on the county planning board, opposed it. She went on to win the primary and defeated Bert Daniel in the general election, becoming the county's youngest commissioner.

In 2018, Barnes defeated former state representative Glen Bradley for the Republican nomination in North Carolina's 7th state house district. That November, she succeeded in unseating incumbent Democratic representative Bobbie Richardson, whose district was heavily redrawn in response to a federal lawsuit alleging racial gerrymandering by the state legislature. Barnes was sworn into office by North Carolina Supreme Court associate justice Paul Martin Newby.

A year into her term, Barnes announced her intention to run for the 11th district state senate seat being vacated by the retiring Rick Horner in 2020. After defeating Johnston County commissioner Patrick Harris and retired Air Force colonel Dennis Nielsen in the March primary by a wide margin, she faced the Democratic nominee, former senator Allen Wellons in November. Barnes defeated Wellons by a ten-point margin.

Personal life
Barnes lives in Spring Hope, North Carolina with her husband, Johnny, president of Barnes Farming Corporation. They have three children: Bethany, Joshua, and Jacy. They attend the Ridgecrest Worship Center in Rocky Mount, where Barnes has served as co-president of Women’s Ministries.

References

External links
North Carolina General Assembly website
Campaign website

|-

Living people
1966 births
Republican Party North Carolina state senators
Republican Party members of the North Carolina House of Representatives
North Carolina State University alumni
People from Nash County, North Carolina
William Peace University alumni
21st-century American politicians